Kurima is a village in Slovakia.

Kurima may also refer to:

Places 
 Kurima-jima, an island of Japan
 Kurima Valley, Western New Guinea
 Kurima, Yahukimo, an village in the Highland Papua

Linguistics 
 Kurima language, a dialect of Grand Valley Dani language of New Guinea